Duanne Abrahams (born 1962) is a South African international lawn and indoor bowler.

Bowls career
He won a silver medal in the fours with Theuns Fraser, Kevin Campbell and Neil Burkett at the 2002 Commonwealth Games in Manchester.

He continues to bowl at the highest level for the Wanderers Bowling Club.

He won the  2014 fours at the National Championships bowling for the Bedfordview Bowls Club.

References

Living people
1962 births
Bowls players at the 2002 Commonwealth Games
South African male bowls players
Commonwealth Games medallists in lawn bowls
Commonwealth Games silver medallists for South Africa
Medallists at the 2002 Commonwealth Games